A semi-synchronous orbit is an orbit with a period equal to half the average rotational period of the body being orbited, and in the same direction as that body's rotation.

For Earth, a semi-synchronous orbit is considered a medium Earth orbit, with a period of just under 12 hours.

Semi-synchronous orbits are typical for GPS satellites.

See also
 Molniya orbit
 List of orbits

References

Earth orbits